Büchner (or Buechner) is a German language surname related to the word Buche and may refer to:

 Eberhard Büchner (born 1939), German tenor
 Ernst Büchner (1850–1925), German chemist after whom the Büchner flask and Büchner funnel are named
 Franz Büchner (1898-1920), German First World War flying ace
 Georg Büchner (1813–1837), German writer and playwright
 Joachim Büchner (1905–1978), German athlete
 Ludwig Büchner (1824–1899), German philosopher
 Wolfgang Büchner (canoeist), German slalom canoeist
 Wolfgang Büchner (journalist) (born 1966), German journalist

In the anglicized spelling "Buechner", it may refer to:
Frederick Buechner (1926-2022), American author and minister
Jack Buechner (1940-2020), American lawyer and politician
John C. Buechner (1934–2018), American educator and politician
Karl Buechner (born 1971), American metalcore vocalist
Margaret Buechner  (1922–1998), a German-born, American composer
Sara Davis Buechner (born David Buechner, 1959), American concert pianist

See also
 Buchner

German-language surnames